Claude Clegg (full name: Claude Andrew Clegg III) is a historian who specializes in the history of the African diaspora in the Americas. He is currently the Lyle V. Jones Distinguished Professor at the University of North Carolina at Chapel Hill, with a joint appointment in African, African American, and Diaspora Studies.

Education
Clegg holds a BA from the University of North Carolina at Chapel Hill and a PhD from the University of Michigan.

Works
Clegg has written several books, including The Black President: Hope and Fury in the Age of Obama, An Original Man: The Life and Times of Elijah Muhammad, Troubled Ground: A Tale of Murder, Lynching, and Reckoning in the New South, and The Price of Liberty: African Americans and the Making of Liberia.

Selected bibliography
 The Black President: Hope and Fury in the Age of Obama, Baltimore: Johns Hopkins University Press, 2021, 
 An Original Man: The Life and Times of Elijah Muhammad, New York: St. Martin’s Press, 1997. Reprinted by the University of North Carolina Press, 2014, .
 The Price of Liberty: African Americans and the Making of Liberia, Chapel Hill: University of North Carolina Press, 2004, .
 Troubled Ground: A Tale of Murder, Lynching, and Reckoning in the New South, Urbana and Chicago: University of Illinois Press, 2010, .

Sources
 Faculty bio page, University of North Carolina at Chapel Hill

External links
 

University of Michigan College of Literature, Science, and the Arts alumni
University of North Carolina at Chapel Hill alumni
University of North Carolina at Chapel Hill faculty
Living people
21st-century American historians
21st-century American male writers
Year of birth missing (living people)
American male non-fiction writers